Brendan Gregg is a computer engineer known for his work on computing performance. He  works for Intel, and previously worked at Netflix, Sun Microsystems, Oracle Corporation, and Joyent. He was born in Newcastle, New South Wales and graduated from the University of Newcastle, Australia.

In November, 2013, he was awarded the LISA Outstanding Achievement Award "For contributions to the field of system administration, particularly groundbreaking work in systems performance analysis methodologies." He investigates and writes about Linux performance on his blog.

Contributions 

Gregg has developed various methodologies for performance analysis, notably the USE Method methodology (short for Utilization Saturation and Errors Method).

He has also created visualization types to aid performance analysis, including latency heat maps, utilization heat maps, subsecond offset heat maps, and flame graphs.

His tools are included in multiple operating systems and products, and are in use by companies worldwide. He pioneered eBPF as an observability technology, including authoring many advanced eBPF tracing tools to provide unique insights into system behavior. As a kernel engineer, he developed the ZFS L2ARC: A pioneering file system performance technology. He has also developed and delivered professional training courses on computer performance.

Gregg has authored hundreds of articles about systems performance and multiple technical books, including Systems Performance 2nd Edition (2020) and BPF Performance Tools (2019), both in the Addison-Wesley professional computing series. His prior books were on Solaris performance and DTrace, and were published by Prentice Hall. His books are recommended or required reading at major technology companies.

Gregg was previously known as the leading expert on using DTrace and the creator of the DTraceToolkit,. He is also the star of the Shouting in the Data Center viral video.

Publications

References

External links

Patents 

Living people
Australian computer scientists
Computer programmers
Solaris people
Year of birth missing (living people)